Fredericktown Presbyterian Church is a historic church located on South Main Street and West 4th Street in Fredericktown, Ohio.

It was built in 1885 and added to the National Register in 1979.

References

Presbyterian churches in Ohio
Churches on the National Register of Historic Places in Ohio
Gothic Revival church buildings in Ohio
Churches completed in 1885
Buildings and structures in Knox County, Ohio
National Register of Historic Places in Knox County, Ohio